Francis Brewster was an Irish politician.

Brasier was born in Dublin educated at Trinity College, Dublin. He was MP for Midleton from 1693 until 1703, and Dingle from 1703 until 1713.

References

Alumni of Trinity College Dublin
Members of the Parliament of Ireland (pre-1801) for County Kerry constituencies
Members of the Parliament of Ireland (pre-1801) for County Cork constituencies
Irish MPs 1695–1699
Irish MPs 1703–1713